Cognitive dysfunction syndrome (CDS) may refer to:

Canine cognitive dysfunction
Feline cognitive dysfunction

See also
Alzheimer's disease, a similar disease in humans